Charles Longueville  (c. 1678–1750) was a British lawyer and Tory and later Whig  politician who sat in the House of Commons from 1715 to 1741.

Longueville was the eldest son  of. William Longueville, barrister, of Inner Temple and his wife Elizabeth Peyton, daughter. of Sir Thomas Peyton, 2nd Baronet, of Knowlton, Kent. His grandfather, Sir Thomas Longueville had been forced to sell the family estates of Bradwell, Buckinghamshire in 1650 as a result of the Civil War. He was admitted at Inner Temple on 5 February 1693 and at Clare College, Cambridge on 24 June1695. In 1702, he was called to the bar. He succeeded his father in 1721.
 
Longueville was returned as a Tory Member of Parliament for Downton at the 1715 general election . He voted against the Government in all recorded divisions. In 1721 the committee enquiring into the South Sea Bubble revealed that he  had accepted stock from the company without paying for it. At the 1722 general election, he was returned as MP  for Great Bedwyn on the Bruce interest. At the accession of George II  he obtained a court place as auditor to Queen Caroline. He was returned at the  1727 as MP for East Looe and from then on, supported Walpole's Administration. In 1728 he became a bencher of his Inn. He was returned again for East Looe at the  1734 general election.  In 1738 he changed his court post and became auditor to Princesses Amelia and Caroline He did not stand at the  1741 general election.

Longueville died unmarried on 22 or 25 August 1750 and was buried at Westminster Abbey.

References

1670s births
1750 deaths
Members of the Parliament of Great Britain for English constituencies
British MPs 1715–1722
British MPs 1722–1727
British MPs 1727–1734
British MPs 1734–1741
British MPs 1741–1747
British MPs 1747–1754
British MPs 1754–1761
Members of Parliament for Great Bedwyn
Members of the Parliament of Great Britain for constituencies in Cornwall